The Patuxent or Pawtuxent were one of the Native American tribes living along the western shore of the Chesapeake Bay.  They spoke an Algonquian language and were loosely dominated by the Piscataway.

Living along the Patuxent River, they were among the first people taught by Andrew White.

The first European to explore the river was Capt. John Smith who sailed 40 miles  of it in 1608, writing: “On the west side of the Bay were five faire and delightful navigable rivers the fifth river is called Pawtuxent.”

The Algonquians migrated here 2,000 years ago. Capt. Smith noted 17 Indian villages along the Patuxent River. English historians asserted that the Indians were not very settled, but—as asserted by archaeologist Wayne Clark—they actually had extensive agricultural fields and raised corn, beans, squash, sunflowers and tobacco; the Indian ‘old fields’ were much in demand because they were already cleared.

As European settlements grew and tobacco plantations took over, surviving Indians moved on.  By 1674, some Pawtuxent Indians lived on 700 acres of land set aside for them by Lord Baltimore at Billingsley Point, now public park land near Upper Marlboro at the confluence of the Patuxent River and Western Branch.     By the 1690s, survivors left that site and joined another group in Chaptico on the Maryland side of the Potomac River in what is now St Mary's County.

References

Further reading
 Land, Aubrey C. . Millwood NY: KTO Press, 1981. 

Extinct Native American tribes
Eastern Algonquian peoples
Native American tribes in Maryland
Extinct ethnic groups